Elkhorn, Kentucky, may refer to either of:

 Elk Horn, Kentucky
 Elkhorn City, Kentucky, originally named (and sometimes shortened to) Elkhorn